ADHS can refer to:

Schools
Acton District High School
Alfred Deakin High School
Almonte and District High School
Athens District High School
Arnprior District High School
Athens Drive High School

Other uses
 The British Adult Dental Health Survey (ADHS)
Attention-deficit hyperactivity disorder, sometimes referred to as attention-deficit hyperactivity syndrome
Appalachian Development Highway System
Arizona Department of Health Services
2-amino-3,7-dideoxy-D-threo-hept-6-ulosonate synthase, an enzyme